Modern Bathroom is a California-based manufacturer and retailer of bathroom fixtures and furniture, specializing in modern and traditional bathroom vanities. Founded in May 2004 by Martin Symes, the company has bathroom showrooms in Orange County and Los Angeles, with the Los Angeles showroom being the largest of its kind in the state of California. Apart from its own Modern Bathroom brand, the company sells brands such as Kohler, Grohe, Fairmont, Danze, Toto, and MTI. In 2011 it began distributing the Wyndham Collection, which was custom designed for Modern Bathroom by Christopher Grubb, a Beverly Hills-based interior designer and HGTV contributor.

Overview 
Modern Bathroom was founded by President and CEO Martin Symes on May 20, 2004. The company began manufacturing contemporary bathroom remodeling products and accessories, and opened its first retail showroom in early 1995. According to the Better Business Bureau, the company is connected to the corporation Vida Lifestyle, Inc.

In 2011 the company operated a warehouse and a showroom in North Hollywood (Los Angeles). There is also a showroom in Fountain Valley, Orange County. The Los Angeles showroom is the largest bathroom vanity showroom in the state of California. In 2006 Modern Bathroom also began operating an online store for customers unable to visit the showrooms.

Products
Most of the original product distribution consisted of the Modern Bathroom brand, but the company later began also stocking products from brands such as Kohler, Grohe, Danze, Toto, MTI, Fairmont Designs, and the Wyndham Collection. It is also a major retail partner with Cole & Co and the Rothdale and Fellino vanity series. The company also stocks items made from sustainable materials.

Modern Bathroom either owns or has connections with the original manufacturing facilities and claims it offers discounts of up to 50% The company ships for free within the 48 contiguous states, and ships to Canada, Alaska, and Hawaii at an additional cost.

Christopher Grubb
On March 30, 2011, HGTV (Home and Garden Television) announced that interior designer and architect Christopher Grubb had custom-designed a new bathroom furniture line for Modern Bathroom.

References 

Building materials companies of the United States
Manufacturing companies established in 2004
Retail companies established in 2004
Companies based in Los Angeles
Bathroom fixture companies